William Fitzsimmons (born 1978) is an American singer-songwriter, based in Nashville. His first two full-length albums, Until When We Are Ghosts (2005) and Goodnight (2006), were completely self-produced and recorded by Fitzsimmons at his former home in Pittsburgh, Pennsylvania.  His The Sparrow and the Crow (2008) was his first studio record. In addition to the above, his music has also been featured on ABC's Brothers & Sisters and Grey's Anatomy spin-off Private Practice, MTV's Life of Ryan and Teen Wolf, The CW's One Tree Hill, CBS's Blue Bloods, ABC Family's Greek, Lifetime's Army Wives, and USA Network's Burn Notice, and he has been given reference in Billboard, Rolling Stone, Paste, Spin, Musikexpress, Uncut, Q Magazine, and Performing Songwriter Magazine.

Biography 
Fitzsimmons was born the youngest child of two blind parents and was raised in Pittsburgh, Pennsylvania. He is said to have developed his multiple instrumental abilities from his mother and father, both of whom were recreational musicians. His childhood home even housed a fully functional pipe organ, hand-built by his father. He was taught the piano and trombone during elementary school, and began teaching himself guitar while in junior high school. He is also proficient at the banjo, melodica, ukulele, and mandolin, and is known for mixing folk music with electronica in some of his production. In addition to performance abilities, Fitzsimmons is credited as the engineer and producer of his first two releases. He is often compared to contemporaries Iron & Wine, Sufjan Stevens, and the late Elliott Smith.

Fitzsimmons' career in music came only after completing a Master's Degree in counseling at Geneva College and working as a mental health therapist. Prior to his graduate studies, Fitzsimmons worked with the mentally ill for several years. It was during a summer break in the midst of graduate school that Fitzsimmons recorded a collection of songs on home recording equipment which would subsequently become his debut album.

Fitzsimmons' writing often includes reference to personal and family subject matter. His 2006 effort, "Goodnight," is said to have been based largely on his parents' divorce during his adolescence, and his 2008 work, "The Sparrow And The Crow," was written entirely about and following his own divorce. Fitzsimmons revealed on the syndicated music program eTown that he recorded the work with a collaborator who he later learned was having a relationship with his wife while they were working on the recording. He revealed that this caused him to delay the release of this work.

Fitzsimmons' music was noticed initially largely through MySpace, and touring with fellow artists Ingrid Michaelson, Brooke Fraser and Cary Brothers among others, and from several featured song placements on popular national television programs such as "Grey's Anatomy." "Hazy," a duet with Rosi Golan, was featured in Dollhouse.

A music video for the song "The Tide Pulls From The Moon" was released on February 8, 2011. In June 2011, Fitzsimmons toured in Europe, presenting his recent album "Gold In The Shadow," which was released March 22 via Nettwerk.

Fitzsimmons' album, Lions, was released on February 18, 2014.

On May 12, 2015, Fitzsimmons released the first of a pair of mini-LP's concerning his family in Pittsburgh, titled "Pittsburgh.".

On April 1, 2016, Fitzsimmons released the second of the pair, his eighth album, entitled Charleroi: Pittsburgh, Vol. 2. The album is about the grandmother he never knew – "Charleroi is the second half of the Pittsburgh story. The Pittsburgh album was about the grandmother I knew. Charleroi is about the one I never did.” per his website. Fitzsimmons embarked on a European tour to support his new album in April 2016, visiting 9 countries along the way.

On October 21, 2016, Fitzsimmons released his first live album, titled William Fitzsimmons Live. The album showcases songs from across Fitzsimmons' career, recorded live at performances in Chicago, Amsterdam, and Paris. The record also features a cover of Fleetwood Mac's "Everywhere," recorded live in Cologne, Germany. Fitzsimmons released a video of his live cover of "Everywhere" on October 19, 2016. Abby Gundersen (sister of singer-songwriter Noah Gundersen, with whom Fitzsimmons toured in 2012) is featured on violin and vocals, and additional instrumentation is contributed by Jake Philips (acoustic guitar, electric guitar, banjo, and vocals) and Adam Popick (drums, synthesizer, rhodes, and acoustic guitar).

Fitzsimmons currently resides in Jacksonville, Illinois.

Awards 
 iTunes US Best Singer-Songwriter Album 2008: The Sparrow and the Crow
 iTunes Australia Best International Singer-Songwriter Album 2009: The Sparrow and the Crow
 iTunes UK Best of 2009 Singer-Songwriter category: Goodnight
 Beards NOW (Aust. publication) Honorable Mention in category 'Bushrangers Beards on non-Australians' 2010
 The tour poster for the 2009 European tour designed by Stefan Guzy and Björn Wiede has been awarded for typographic excellence by the German Art Directors Club and was selected among the 100 best posters of 2009 in Germany.

Discography

References

External links

Living people
American folk musicians
American folk guitarists
American male guitarists
American male singer-songwriters
Musicians from Pittsburgh
People from Jacksonville, Illinois
1978 births
Singer-songwriters from Pennsylvania
Singer-songwriters from Illinois
Guitarists from Illinois
Guitarists from Pennsylvania
Indie folk musicians
21st-century American singers
21st-century American guitarists
21st-century American male singers
Nettwerk Music Group artists
Grönland Records artists